is a Japanese composer and guitarist who works for Sega, known for his various contributions in the Sonic the Hedgehog video game series. He is also the songwriter for the band Crush 40, which has also contributed to many Sonic games.

Biography
Senoue was born on August 2, 1970, in Matsushima, Miyagi, Japan, and started playing the piano at the age of three. After moving to Panama at the age of 12, he became dedicated to rock music after being exposed to MTV. He began to teach himself to play the electric guitar at the age of 15, and made his first original band recording by the age of 17.
After graduating from college with a degree in economics from Aoyama Gakuin University in 1993, Senoue sent demo tapes to Namco and Sega, later hiring him. His first project with the company was on Dark Wizard, where he arranged a medley of the game's music for its staff roll. After that, he wrote a few pieces of music and jingles for Sonic the Hedgehog 3, his first involvement in the Sonic series. After doing multiple projects in the Worldwide Soccer series in the mid 1990s, among other games such as the Sega Genesis version of Sonic 3D Blast, Senoue was selected to be the lead composer and sound director of Sonic Adventure in 1998. The game's success led to his name becoming known worldwide, as well as him being promoted to the sound director of the series.

After the completion of Sonic Adventure, Senoue moved to San Francisco in 1999 and began to work on Sonic Team USA games such as NASCAR Arcade, Sonic Adventure 2, Sonic Heroes, and Shadow the Hedgehog. In 2005, Senoue released an EP with Japanese voice actress Junko Noda, titled "Ready!". The project went under the name JxJ, and was only available to purchase in Japan. In 2007, Senoue provided three new arrangements for the Japanese console release of OutRun 2 SP, including covers of existing series tracks "Splash Wave" and "Rush a Difficulty", and an original track titled "Lift You Up!". Also in 2007, Senoue arranged and performed "Angel Island Zone" from Sonic the Hedgehog 3 for Super Smash Bros. Brawl. In 2010, Senoue performed several gigs in Tokyo with former Magna-Fi guitarist, C.J. Szuter, in a band called Bubblicious Blvd.

In 2009, Senoue announced a compilation album titled The Works. Containing only three Sonic related songs, it mostly features more obscure works he provided for other games. The album was released on October 21, 2009. More recently, Senoue worked as the sound director, composer, and arranger for Sonic the Hedgehog 4: Episode I, Episode II, and Sonic Generations. At a Sonic festival at Joypolis in December 2015, Senoue announced a sequel to The Works, titled The Works II, which released two months later.

Crush 40

Crush 40 is a hard rock band originally formed by Senoue in 2000 to perform on NASCAR Arcade. It consists of Senoue on guitars, Johnny Gioeli on vocals, Toru Kawamura on drums, and Takeshi Taneda on bass. Since its inception, the band has created several theme songs for the Sonic the Hedgehog series. In October 2008, Crush 40 took the stage at the Tokyo Game Show to perform some of their most popular Sonic based songs in front of a live audience for the first time. Gioeli and Senoue have since created a YouTube account and uploaded video footage of the event. In 2009, a new Crush 40 album was released titled The Best of Crush 40: Super Sonic Songs. The compilation contained most of the band's Sonic releases, as well as a mixture of old tracks from NASCAR Arcade and brand new songs. In August 2010, Crush 40 performed at the "Summer of Sonic" convention in London, marking their first full-length performance and first performance outside Japan. In 2012, the band performed at two conventions, at the Summer of Sonic in Brighton and at the Sonic Boom event during the San Diego Comic-Con.

The band released their first live album in October 2012, titled Live!, which featured songs from their concerts in Tokyo. In August 2013, the band performed in St. Louis for the Sonic Boom 2013 event, and also performed at the 2015 Youmacon in Detroit. For the 25th anniversary of the Sonic series, Crush 40 performed at the San Diego House of Blues during Comic-Con in July 2016, and at Summer of Sonic in London the following month. At the 2017 Comic-Con in July, Senoue performed various Sonic material with the Video Game Orchestra. Crush 40 also contributed to 2019's Team Sonic Racing, performing its main theme "Green Light Ride".

Works
All works listed below were composed by Senoue unless otherwise noted.

References

External links
 

1970 births
Aoyama Gakuin University alumni
Crush 40 members
Japanese hard rock musicians
Japanese keyboardists
Japanese male composers
Japanese rock keyboardists
Japanese rock guitarists
Living people
Musicians from Miyagi Prefecture
Sega people
Sonic the Hedgehog
Video game composers